Gitarzan was Ray Stevens' fourth studio album, released in 1969, as well as his second for Monument Records. Unlike his previous album, Even Stevens, this album is completely in the genres of novelty and comedy. Although this is a true studio album, all of the songs are overdubbed with cheering and applauding of an audience to provide the feeling of a live album. Contents include three of the Coasters' hits ("Yakety Yak," "Little Egypt" and "Along Came Jones"), "Mr. Custer," and "Alley Oop." The album also contains re-recordings of his two novelty hits, "Harry the Hairy Ape" and "Ahab the Arab." "Freddie Feelgood (And His Funky Little Five Piece Band)" makes its first appearance on an album but is overdubbed with audience noises for this album.

The back of the album cover contains an essay that was written by Merv Griffin and describes Ray Stevens' musical styles. Included in the essay is an anecdote about Stevens' appearance on The Merv Griffin Show while promoting his hit "Unwind." Griffin also mentions that he and Arthur Treacher are featured in a performance of the song "Gitarzan" as the voices of Jane and Cheetah "(in the order of your choice)" during a visit from Stevens on Griffin's talk-show. In the official recording, though, Stevens does the vocals for all the characters.

Aside from "Freddie Feelgood," two singles were lifted from this album: the title track (which tells a bizarre story about Tarzan and Jane and Cheetah forming a music band) and "Along Came Jones". The album version of the former begins with cheers and applause from an audience while the single version does not.

On July 2, 1996, Varèse Sarabande rereleased this album on CD and included three bonus tracks, all three of which were singles after the release of this album: "The Streak," "The Moonlight Special," and "Bridget the Midget (The Queen of the Blues)."

Track listing

CD bonus tracks
"The Streak" - (Ray Stevens)
"The Moonlight Special" - (Ray Stevens)
"Bridget the Midget (The Queen of the Blues)" - (Ray Stevens)

Personnel
Produced by: Fred Foster, Ray Stevens, Jim Malloy
Arranger: Ray Stevens
Jerry Carrigan - drums
Norbert Putnam - bass
Dick Kent - announcer
Jim Malloy, Charlie Tallent - engineer
Bill Forshee - photography
Ken Kim - art direction

Charts
Album - Billboard (North America)

Singles - Billboard (North America)

1969 albums
Ray Stevens albums
Monument Records albums
Albums produced by Fred Foster
Albums produced by Ray Stevens
Albums arranged by Ray Stevens
Varèse Sarabande albums